Montgomery College (MC) is a public community college in Montgomery County, Maryland. Founded officially in 1946 as Montgomery Junior College, its name comes from the county in which it is located. The earliest start date that can be contributed to Montgomery College is October 15, 1893, when the Bliss Electrical School began. Bliss was absorbed by the current college in 1950 and became the electrical program for the school.

The college has three campuses, the largest of which is in Rockville. Its other campuses are in Takoma Park/Silver Spring and Germantown. Its off-campus sites include the Business Training Center in Gaithersburg and Westfield South in Wheaton, which are operated by the college's Workforce Development and Continuing Education Division.

History

19th century 
The Bliss Electrical School was a private, for-profit institution in Takoma Park, Maryland. Established in 1893 and named after its founder Louis D. Bliss. Its first class was on October 15, 1893, in a single room on the third floor of Water Building at the corner of Ninth and Ebbs Street. It was a night class with 26 students, including Thomas E. Robertson, who would later go on to be the United States Commissioner of Patents. The capital investment in the school was $400, representing an advance payment of $20 each from 20 men. Two years later in 1895, Charles Francis Jenkins, of motion picture and television fame, enrolled as a student at Bliss.

20th century
W. B. Connelly, a 1904 graduate of Bliss, had charge for the General Electric Company at Schenectady of the inspection of some two miles of switchboards for the control of the Panama Canal electric installation. Before going to the GE company, Connelly was on the staff at Bliss, and instructed Skipwith B. Cole, then a student, and later dean of the faculty at Bliss. On November 6, 1908, the entire plant of the Bliss Electrical School, at Takoma Park was destroyed by fire and it had to relocate to a new position. William Jennings Bryant, Secretary of State, addressed the graduating class of the Bliss Electrical School in the church auditorium in the Calvary Baptist Church on June 3, 1914. In 1917, the United States entered the First World War. By special permission granted by the War Department, the Bliss Electrical School organized a searchlight company of engineers consisting of 57 men from the 1917 class, headed by Lt. Clyde K. Krisee of the faculty, and under Major [John C.] Gotwals of the Engineer Corps of the United States Army. This company went overseas with the First Division of the American Expeditionary Forces. These men were used for instruction purposes in a searchlight school in Paris. All returned safely to the United States after the war except one, who was killed in an automobile accident in Paris. The captured German searchlight, which adorns the campus, was presented to the Bliss Electrical School by the War Department as a tribute to the work of the Bliss Searchlight Company of Engineers.

At the request of the War Department in 1918, Bliss School prepared an intensive training course in the fundamentals of electricity for drafted men entering the Army. This course was adopted by the War Department, and was the first course used in all the colleges throughout the country, giving instructions along this line to army personnel in the Student Army Training Corps. The school contracted with the War Department to house, feed, and instruct selected groups of soldiers for this course. Beginning June 15, 1918, the school trained 700 soldiers in three detachments. The contract called for training these men at cost. This cost was determined by the auditors in the War Department at $2.00 for the first detachment, at $1.80 for the second detachment, and $1.62 for the third detachment per man per day for housing, feeding, instruction, and supplies. The school was under military control following instruction hence, following the signing of the armistice on November 11, 1918. The third and last detachment of the Student Army Training Corps was mustered out and disbanded on December 6, 1918, and the school was released from military control. In 1919 Bliss returned to civilian training. The first edition of the Bliss School textbook, Theoretical and Practical Electrical Engineering, was published in September 1921.

During World War II Bliss had the distinction of being selected by the U.S. Navy as one of six engineering schools to give Primary School in the Electronics Training Program and it graduated over 3,000 students. Bliss Electrical School's building was sold to Montgomery County for $350,000. 

The current college was organized in 1946 as "Montgomery Junior College," with its campus located at the Bethesda-Chevy Chase High School. Its first dean was Hugh G. Price. The first day of class was held on September 16, 1946. During its first school year, it had about 175 students.

In 1950, the college moved to Takoma Park, absorbing the Bliss Electrical School 
Previously, Montgomery Junior College could only hold evening classes because the high school used the building for its classes during the day, but with the acquisition of Bliss Electrical School's building, Montgomery Junior College began holding daytime classes as well. The first day of classes at the new location began on October 2, 1950. At the time, it was segregated, with an enrollment of over 500 students.  The newly established Carver Junior College in Rockville was expected to have 40 African-Americans enrolled, but only 19 managed to show up, due both to problems in finding transportation to school and the cost of tuition.

The Rockville campus of Montgomery College opened in September 1965, and the Germantown campus opened in early 1970s, occupying its present permanent site since 1978. Montgomery College also offers learning opportunities through its extensive Workforce Development and Continuing education programs.

21st century 
In 2010, DeRionne Pollard assumed leadership of Montgomery College, and its three campuses. She spearheaded the development of a new Montgomery College mission and strategic plan. She has partnered actively with Montgomery County Public Schools and the universities at Shady Grove in the creation of Achieving Collegiate Excellence and Success (ACES), a support program designed to help disadvantaged students transition from high school to college completion. The program now has 1,700 students enrolled. Montgomery College is also a member of Achieving the Dream network, a non-governmental reform movement for student success at community colleges.

In 2016, NBC 4 investigated frivolous spending claims made by students and staff against Pollard. NBC 4 had received letters from staff throughout the summer asking the news organization to investigate the president. In response, the school released a statement supporting Pollard and claiming that none of the charges were unjustified, and that there was no inappropriate use of college funds. The matter was dropped.

Campuses

Takoma Park / Silver Spring 
The Takoma Park campus began expanding into neighboring city of Silver Spring with the opening of a new Health Sciences Center in January 2004. The campus expansion in Silver Spring included the addition of The Morris and Gwendolyn Cafritz Arts Center which opened in fall 2007. The building houses the campus visual arts programs and the School of Art + Design, formerly the Maryland College of Art and Design, which merged with Montgomery College in September 2004. To reflect the campus's expansion into Silver Spring, the Board of Trustees renamed the Takoma Park campus as the "Takoma Park/Silver Spring Campus" in June 2005. The Cultural Arts Center, which contains two theaters, opened in 2009.

Rockville 

In 2008, Montgomery College named its Rockville Campus gallery the Sarah Silberman Art Gallery. In addition to donating $500,000 for its complete renovation, Sarah Silberman funded two endowed scholarships in ceramics and sculpture. In 2011, Montgomery College built its new Science Center on the Rockville Campus which features 29 new laboratories.  In January 2017, the new North Garage with over 900 covered parking spaces was opened on the Rockville campus.

Germantown 

In 2011, the Montgomery College Germantown Campus started to expand with the addition of the Life Sciences Park which features the new Holy Cross Germantown Hospital. In 2014, the Germantown Campus add a new Bioscience Education Center which features wet labs, a detached greenhouse complex, and a meeting/conference center.

Libraries 
The Montgomery College Libraries system has a location at each campus.

Organization and administration 
The Montgomery College Foundation is a 501(c)(3) (tax-exempt) charitable organization governed by business, alumni and community members. The foundation, with assets of $126,554,999, according to the 2017 IRS 990 form, also helps fund the college, placing it among the top five community colleges in the nation in private funding.

Montgomery College's fiscal year 2019 tax-supported operating budget was $262 million, with funding from Montgomery County, the state of Maryland, and student tuition and fees.

Presidents 
The president of Montgomery College oversees the operations of three academic campuses of Montgomery College in Maryland.
 Hugh G. Price (1948–1953)
 Donald E. Deyo (1953–1965)
 George A. Hodson (1965–1966)
 William C. Strasser (1966–1979)
 Robert E. Parilla (1979–1998)
 Charlene R. Nunley (1998–2007)
 Brian K. Johnson (2007–2009)
 Hercules Pinkney (2009–2010, acting)
 DeRionne P. Pollard (2010–2021)
 Charlene Mickens Dukes (2021–2022, interim)
 Jermaine F. Williams (2022–present)

Academics 
Montgomery College has an enrollment of over 55,000 credit and noncredit students. Of the Montgomery County Public Schools graduates who choose to stay in Maryland for college, 56% attend Montgomery College within the following academic year. The college is one of the most ethnically and culturally diverse in the nation, with students from over 170 countries enrolled. The student body of the college is 54% female and 46% male; 90% of college students are in-county residents; and the student body ethnicity is 27% black, 25% hispanic, and 23% white.
The college also employs more than 1,500 faculty members.

Montgomery College is accredited by the Middle States Commission on Higher Education. It offers associate degrees and a variety of professional certificates and letters of recognition. The degrees offered are Associate of Arts (A.A.), Associate of Science (A.S.), Associate of Applied Science (A.A.S.), Associate of Arts in Teaching (A.A.T.), and Associate of Fine Arts (A.F.A.).

The Rockville campus offers more than 600 courses in more than 40 curricula.  The Takoma Park/Silver Spring campus is known for its nursing and allied health science career programs, and the Germantown campus is known for its science programs including computer science and biotechnology.

Montgomery College offers study abroad to over 25 countries. In 2018, Montgomery College students transferred to 375 four-year colleges and universities in 48 states and Puerto Rico.

Admissions and costs 

As with most community colleges, admission to Montgomery College is not selective. The college is open to students who are high school graduates or have received their General Equivalency Diploma (GED); the college does not require standardized test scores, such as the SAT or ACT, for admission.

The total tuition and fees per semester, as of 2022, with 15-hours of credits are:
 $2,661 — Montgomery County resident
 $5,127 — Maryland state resident
 $7,017 — Non Maryland resident

Costs can be more complex than the listed prices, as certain students can qualify for financial aid in the forms of scholarships, student loans, work-study programs, and grants. Tuition rates can be impacted by county budgets and admission trends.

Student life

Media
Each of Montgomery College's three campuses has its own student-run newspaper: The Globe (Germantown), The Advocate (Rockville), and The Excalibur (Takoma Park/Silver Spring).

At its Rockville campus, the college also operates eRadio WMCR, a student-run online radio station, and the award winning MCTV, a 24/7 cable channel that produces programming for and about the college community.

Athletics
The Montgomery College athletics teams are collectively known as the Raptors.  During the Spring 2012 semester the college rebranded the mascot to be representative of all campuses.  Sports teams are divided among campuses and compete in the NJCAA.  Prior to the Spring 2012 semester, each Montgomery College campus had its own athletic teams. The athletic teams were formerly known as the Knights of the Rockville Campus, the Falcons of the Takoma Park/Silver Spring Campus, and the Gryphons of the Germantown Campus.

The basketball/volleyball arena, Knights Arena in Rockville, was home to the Maryland Nighthawks of the Premier Basketball League for the 2007 season, before the team moved to Georgetown Preparatory School Field House.

The baseball field, Knights Field, is the home field of the Rockville Express, a member of the Cal Ripken, Sr. Collegiate Baseball League.

In the Fall 2018 semester, Montgomery College teams were elevated to Division I and Division II levels. The Montgomery College teams elevated to the Division I level were men's soccer, women's soccer, men's outdoor track and field, and women's outdoor track and field. The Montgomery College volleyball, men's basketball, women's basketball, baseball, and softball teams are now competing in NJCAA Division II.

National championships
The Knights (Rockville Campus) women's tennis team won the NJCAA Division III National Championship in 2001 and again in 2006. Montgomery College-Rockville golfer Brent Davis won the NJCAA Division III Individual Championship in 2005 with a score of 288.

The Raptors women's track and field team won back to back NJCAA Division III National Championships in 2015 and 2016. The Raptors men's track and field team won back to back to back NJCAA Division III National Championships in 2014, 2015, and 2016.

Notable people 

Montgomery College has served over 450,000 credit students since its founding in 1946 including :
 Tori Amos – American singer-songwriter
 Dubfire – Iranian-American house and techno DJ
 Neal Fredericks (1989) – cinematographer
 Molly Guion, artist
 Paul James – American television and film actor
 Zayed Khan – Indian actor
 Joshua Leonard
 Rick Leventhal – American news reporter and correspondent for Fox News
 Chelsea Manning – former United States Army soldier convicted of violations of the Espionage Act and other offenses, after disclosing to WikiLeaks nearly 750,000 military and diplomatic documents.
 Komelia Hongja Okim – sculptor, professor emerita
 Eduardo Sánchez (1990) – director of The Blair Witch Project.
 Barbara Walsh – American musical theatre actress of Broadway shows, who received a Tony Award nomination
 Jerome Williams – former professional basketball player for the National Basketball Association (NBA)
 Morgan Wootten – American high school basketball coach

References

External links
 Official website

 
1946 establishments in Maryland
Community and junior colleges in Maryland
Educational institutions established in 1946
Universities and colleges in Montgomery County, Maryland
NJCAA athletics